London Midland and Scottish Railway (LMS) Coronation Class 6229 (British Railways number 46229) Duchess of Hamilton is a preserved steam locomotive built in September 1938 by the LMS Crewe Works and operated until February 1964.

Service 
6229 was built in 1938 at Crewe as the tenth member of its class and the last in the second batch of five red streamliners, complete with gold speed cheat stripes (the original five 6220-4 having been given a unique Caledonian blue livery with silver stripes). In 1939 no. 6229 swapped identities with the first of the class 6220 Coronation and was sent to North America with a specially-constructed Coronation Scot train to appear at the 1939 New York World's Fair. There was therefore for a while a blue 6229 Duchess of Hamilton in the UK and a red 6220 Coronation in the US. R.A. Riddles drove for most of the tour, owing to the illness of the assigned driver. The locomotive (though not its carriages) was shipped back from the US in 1942 after the outbreak of the Second World War, and the identities of the locomotives were swapped back in 1943. The carriages returned in 1946.

6229 was painted wartime black livery in November 1944. Its streamlined casing was removed for maintenance-efficiency reasons in December 1947 and it was then given the LMS 1946 black livery. In 1948, 6229 passed into BR ownership. BR renumbered the locomotive as 46229 on 15 April 1948. It was painted in the short-lived BR blue livery in April 1950, but was soon repainted on 26 April 1952 into Brunswick green. The semi-streamlined smokebox was replaced with a round-topped smokebox in February 1957, and in September 1958 the locomotive was painted maroon. The lining was BR style to begin with; then in October 1959 it received the current LMS style lining which it has carried for all the years in preservation.

Preservation 
46229 was saved from the scrap yard along with non streamlined classmate 6233 Duchess of Sutherland, as a result of Sir Billy Butlin's efforts to place these locomotives as children's playground exhibits at his holiday camps. The third preserved member of the class 6235 City of Birmingham was donated by British Railways to Birmingham City Council for preservation within the Birmingham Industrial Museum.

Having started construction work in the winter of 1961, the new £2 million Butlins Minehead camp opened to the public on 26 May 1962. Duchess of Hamilton and LB&SCR A1 class Knowle were added in 1964, after being transported there by Pickfords.

Under a camp refurbishment and modernisation programme, the locomotives left the holiday camp in March 1975 via railhead access at Minehead railway station and the then closed West Somerset Railway. In 1976, the Friends of the National Railway Museum accepted the locomotive from Butlin's on a twenty-year loan deal, and immediately began to restore and preserve it. It first ran as the Museum's flagship locomotive in 1980 and was operational until 1985. After purchasing the locomotive from Butlin's in 1987, after an extensive overhaul it resumed running in 1989, withdrawn from main line duty in 1996 when its seven-year boiler ticket expired.

From 1998 to 2005, 46229 was a static exhibit in the National Railway Museum, standing next to Mallard. In September 2005 the National Railway Museum announced that the streamlining would be re-instated, returning the locomotive to its original appearance. This work was undertaken at Tyseley Locomotive Works and on 18 May 2009 it was returned to the National Railway Museum, going on display in a new exhibition called "Duchess of Hamilton Streamlined: Styling An Era". Since then, the locomotive is on display next to a 1937 Chrysler Airflow.

Gallery

References

External links 

 Railuk database

6229 Duchess of Hamilton
Preserved London, Midland and Scottish Railway steam locomotives
Individual locomotives of Great Britain
Standard gauge steam locomotives of Great Britain
United Kingdom streamliner trains